Tõnu Samuel (born 3 July 1972) is an Estonian hacker commonly cited by mainstream media in topics regarding network security.

Samuel was born in Tallinn.  Between 1979 and 1988, he attended the Tallinn Secondary Science School. In 1990–1992 he took courses in business and financial management. His career as a programmer began in 1991, while working at the Estonian Ministry of Communication.

In 2011 Samuel moved to work in Japan, before that he lived about 10 years in Räpina in southeastern Estonia.

References

 http://www.ohtuleht.ee/112959
 http://www.reporter.ee/2009/05/22/hakker-tonu-samuel-kondas-keskerakonna-kodukal/
 http://www.tartupostimees.ee/94096/arvutiguru-tonu-samuel-alustas-kohtuteed-vaidetavate-ahvardajate-suhtes/
 http://www.e24.ee/492760/tonu-samuel-elion-peaks-andma-sisulisemat-infot/

External links 

1972 births
Living people
People from Tallinn
Estonian computer programmers
People associated with computer security
Estonian expatriates in Japan